BDBC may refer to:

Basingstoke and Deane Borough Council
Bluecoats Drum and Bugle Corps, a competitive junior drum and bugle corps
Business Development Bank of Canada, a Canadian federal bank
Disulfide bond formation protein C, a protein